The following is a list of Intel Core microprocessors.

Core

Core 2

1st generation

2nd generation

3rd generation

4th generation

5th generation

6th generation

7th generation

8th generation

9th generation

10th generation

11th generation

12th generation

13th generation

See also
 Enhanced Pentium M (microarchitecture)
 List of Intel Pentium M microprocessors
 List of Intel Pentium processors
 Comparison of Intel processors

References

External links 
 Intel Core Solo mobile processor product order code table
 Intel Core Duo mobile processor product order code table
 Search MDDS Database
 Intel ARK Database
 Intel Core Duo Processor and Core Solo Processor on 65 nm Process Datasheet
 Intel Core Duo Processor and Core Solo Processor on 65 nm Process Specification Update

Core
Intel Core